John Stenner (September 15, 1964 – May 16, 1994) was an American cyclist. He competed in the team time trial at the 1992 Summer Olympics, and won the United States National Time Trial Championships in the same year. Two years later, Stenner was killed in a road accident when the sun blocked the view of the oncoming driver.

References

External links
 

1964 births
1994 deaths
American male cyclists
Olympic cyclists of the United States
Cyclists at the 1992 Summer Olympics
Place of birth missing